Ruth Hildegard Rosemarie Niehaus (1925–1994) was a German stage and film actress.

She was married to Jewish German spy Ivar Lissner.

Filmography

Bibliography
 Von Moltke, Johannes. No Place Like Home: Locations Of Heimat In German Cinema. University of California Press, 2005.

References

External links

1928 births
1994 deaths
German film actresses
German stage actresses
People from Krefeld
20th-century German actresses